Carole Ita White is an American television and film actress.

Early life
 
Carole Ita White was born in New York City to actors Jesse White and Celia ("Simmy") Cohn. Her father was a character actor, appearing in dozens of films and TV programs for more than 50 years. Her sister is Janet Jonas.

Career
Carole Ita White started appearing in episodic TV and small film roles in the early 1970s. Her first TV job was a TV movie titled Evil Roy Slade, starring John Astin, Mickey Rooney, and Milton Berle. The movie was written by producer and director Garry Marshall. Marshall cast her in a role on his series The Odd Couple.

She played Big Rosie Greenbaum on Laverne & Shirley. White landed the recurring role after an appearance as Raunchy Girl 1 in the first season episode "Dating Slump". Big Rosie was first seen as a nemesis to the title characters during the second season in the episode "Bachelor Mothers". She continued to make appearances as Big Rosie during the second and third seasons of the show. White did not appear again until the seventh season in an episode where Laverne and Shirley attend a high school reunion ("Class of '56").

White made guest starring appearances on such programs as Mary Hartman, Mary Hartman, The Love Boat, Beverly Hills, 90210, The Wayans Bros. and Profiler. She appeared on several game shows, including The $20,000 Pyramid. She has continued to appear in small roles in films over the years, including Falling Down, The Witches of Eastwick, Grand Canyon, and The Fabulous Baker Boys. She appeared in the 2006 independent film Wannabe.

Personal life
On January 19, 2010, White came out as a bisexual during an interview on Sirius Radio's Frank Decaro Show on OutQ Gay Radio.

Filmography

References

External links

20th-century American actresses
21st-century American actresses
Actresses from New York City
American film actresses
American television actresses
Living people
People from Greater Los Angeles
Bisexual actresses
Bisexual women
LGBT people from New York (state)
21st-century American LGBT people
Year of birth missing (living people)